Lemare is a surname. Notable people with the surname include:

Edwin Lemare (1865–1934), English organist and composer
Iris Lemare (1902–1997), English conductor and musician, daughter of Edwin
Léa Lemare (born 1996), French ski jumper

See also
Lemar (given name)